Huang Jun (born 8 March 1990) is a Chinese former footballer.

Career statistics

Club

Notes

References

1990 births
Living people
Chinese footballers
Association football midfielders
Singapore Premier League players
Beijing Guoan F.C. players